Epicimelia is a monotypic moth genus in the family Cimeliidae first described by Maximilian Korb in 1900. Its only species, Epicimelia theresiae, described by the same author in the same year, is found in Turkey and Iran.

Subspecies
Epicimelia theresiae theresiae
Epicimelia theresiae schellhornae Amsel, 1979

References

Cimeliidae
Moths described in 1900
Monotypic moth genera